Karma Kāṇḍa (Sanskrit: कर्मकाण्ड) refers to the section of the Vedas that lists the performance of rituals and sacrificial rites for material benefits or for liberation, which were historically performed by Brahmins in exchange for a Dakshina.

See also
 Dharma
 Karma
 Maya
 Bhagavad Gita
 Hinduism
 Brahmin

References

Rituals in Hindu worship